Krinos (Greek: Κρίνος) may refer to:

Krinos Foods, a North American company that imports and manufactures Greek food
Krinos, Achaea, a village in Achaea, Greece